Cândești is a commune in Neamț County, Western Moldavia, Romania. It is composed of six villages: Bărcănești, Cândești, Dragova, Pădureni, Țârdenii Mici and Vădurele.

References

Communes in Neamț County
Localities in Western Moldavia